The Kalagan (also spelled Kagan, Kaagan, or by the Spanish as Caragan) are a subgroup of the Mandaya-Mansaka people who speak the Kalagan language. The Kalagan comprise three subgroups which are usually treated as different tribes: the Tagakaulo, the Kagan, and the Kal’lao people of Samal. They are native to areas within Davao del Sur, Compostela Valley, Davao del Norte (including Samal Island), Davao Oriental, and North Cotabato; between the territories of the Blaan people and the coastline. They were historically composed of small warring groups. They are renowned as agriculturalists, cultivating rice, corn, abaca, and coconut for cash crops, whereas their counterparts living along the coast practice fishing.

The "Kalagan" or "Kaagan" or "Kagan: name came from the native word "Kaag", which means "fellow" and the other meaning is "to inform" or "secrecy" because they are the people who bring the news and warn their neighbouring tribes ( the Mansaka and Mandayas) on any types of attacks from the other ethnic groups since they are living on shorelines and river deltas of Davao Gulf, on which they are the first one who can encounter on whatever attacks or conquering happen. They were historically composed of small groups led by datus.

The Kagan subgroup are the Islamized-indigenous people in the Davao gulf area. They are one of the Muslim minority groups in Mindanao and belong to the 13 Muslim Moro tribes of the Bangsamoro family. They became Muslim in the middle of the 19th century due to a combination of factors, including the influence of Tausug migrants from Davao, extensive exposure or contact with the communities of their Maguindanaon neighbors, and intermarriages between Kalagan and Maguindanaons or Tausugs. The Islamized Kagan are heavily influenced by Maguindanaon culture.

Geography

The Kalagan people are most predominantly found on the River Delta areas surrounding the shorelines of Davao Gulf.

They lived in the District of Sirawan, Bangkal and Maa of Davao City, Kaganguwan in Panabo City, Hijo,  Bingcongan, Madaum in Tagum, Davao del Norte (including Samal Island), Piso, Macangao, Sumlog, Kaligaran, Lukatan,  Mati in Davao Oriental, Pantukan , Mabini and Maco of Davao de Oro, and some areas in North Cotabato; between the territories of the Blaan people, and the Mandaya / Mansaka. The Caraga Region is named after them.

Etymology 

Kagan came from the word kaag, which means to inform, to secure or secrecy. It is a native word used by the tribe earlier when they have to inform the people in the tribe and also on their neighbouring tribes, the Mandayas and Mansakas about something happen since they are living in the river keys and coastal areas of Davao. The other term also is Ka – allagan which means shining light referring from to the sun due as they are believed to be more advanced in lifestyle and society than their neighbouring tribes which live on the highlands of the mountains of Davao.

History

Pre-Islamic era 
The Kalagans lived in communities called banwa. The banwas were usually located at the rivers and the river keys of Davao. Each banwa has its own leader called a datu. The datu is usually a man with a strong political and physical leadership among the community.

Before Islam came to Mindanao, the early Kalagans were believed to be animist and they believed that there is a one supreme God called Tagallang, which means "creator". They also believed that all of nature like trees, stones, mountains, the river and ocean has a spirit, that they called maguya. The Kalagan respected the maguya by performing ceremonial rituals. 

The ones who performs the rituals are priests called balyans which means shaman or healer or the one who can contact the spirits by asking cure for the sick, for the guidance and security of the tribe, and even fortune-telling. The balyans may either be a man or woman, and they are specialized in contacting the spiritual realm. Same as the Mandayas, the Kalagan people contact the spiritual realm by performing a kulintang and a ritual dance holding a kasag, a native shield with bells surrounding it, while the balyans dance, the bells creating a sound as an activation of the spirits to enter the body of the balyan.

Sultanate era 

It is believed that Kagans were Islamized by the early 16th century by Muslim missionaries from their neighbouring tribes the Maguindanaon and Tausugs in western Mindanao. They  intermarried and shared their culture with the Kagans and brought 4 Qurans to them for the guidance of the faith. These 4 Qurans still exist today and are owned by prominent families of the tribe. They follow the traditional Sunni Shafié of Islam, however many of them remained animist and still believe in the traditions and religion of their ancestors, practicing a mix of Islam and animism in their adat.

Language 

The Kalagan language is similar to the Tagakaolo language but have increasingly incorporated some Tausug and Maguindanaon words. Some also know Cebuano, Filipino (Tagalog), English, and Arabic. It is related to the Mandayan language as well as Maguindanaon, Tausug, and Visayan language.

Culture 
The Kalagans are self-sufficient farmers, producing nearly all of their own food. Wet-rice is grown in the lowlands, and dry-rice and corn are farmed in the upland areas. Yams and sweet potatoes are also staple crops. Vegetables such as tomatoes, squash, and beans are grown; coconuts abound and many kinds of fruit are available. Goats are raised for meat, and chickens are raised for both eggs and meat. In addition to farming, the Kalagans catch fish and obtain wild foods and other various materials from the marshes around them.

Those of highest rank in their society do not perform manual labor. Among the rest of the population, male/female division of labor is not very pronounced. Generally, men do the plowing, tilling, and other heavy farm work. The women do most of the domestic work, often assisted by their older children.

Traditional Kalagan art includes weaving, basketry, and various ornamental crafts. Personal adornment in the form of bright clothing, beaded jewelry, and other accessories is distinctive and colorful. On special occasions, graceful dances are performed to the rhythmic music of gongs and other instruments.

The Kalagan social structure is unusual because it is modified by a system of social rank, certain rules of descent, and distinctive marriage patterns. For most purposes, social rank is less important than blood ties. Higher-ranking families maintain elaborate genealogies to prove their claims of descent.

There is a strong preference for marriage between related families, especially marriage to second cousins. After marriage, the couple usually resides in the husband's community. Today, however, many young couples form their own independent households.

See also 
Kalagan language

 Mansakan languages

Davao Region

Caraga

Ethnic groups in the Philippines

 Lumad

References

Muslim communities of the Philippines
Ethnic groups in Mindanao